Wynne Evans BEM MStJ (born 27 January 1972) is a Welsh singer, comedian, and actor, known for his role as Gio Compario and latterly himself in the Go.compare insurance adverts on television in the United Kingdom. 

Evans sang the role of Ubaldo Piangi in the 25th anniversary production of Andrew Lloyd Webber's The Phantom of the Opera at the Royal Albert Hall, and sang "Glory Glory Tottenham Hotspur" at the last game at White Hart Lane. He reprised the song at the opening of Spurs' new stadium.

Opera singer 
Born in Carmarthen, Wales, Evans studied at the Guildhall School of Music and Drama and the National Opera Studio.

In late 2011 Evans was cast as the opera singer Ubaldo Piangi, in the 25th anniversary celebratory production of Andrew Lloyd Webber's The Phantom of the Opera at the Royal Albert Hall

Evans enjoys a close association with Welsh National Opera where his roles include Nemorino in L'elisir d'amore, Cassio in Otello (S4C Broadcast), The Duke in Rigoletto, Rodolfo in La bohème, Pedrillo in Die Entführung aus dem Serail, Tamino in Die Zauberflöte, Alfredo in La traviata, Jaquino in Leonore (BBC Broadcast), the Schoolmaster in The Cunning Little Vixen, the Chevalier in Les Dialogues des Carmelites, the Italian Tenor in Der Rosenkavalier, the First Jew in Salome (S4C and BBC Broadcast), Liberto in L'incoronazione di Poppea, Brighella in Ariadne auf Naxos and Alfred in Die Fledermaus.

He made his debut at the Royal Opera House, Covent Garden  in 2009 singing Vakula in the new production of Cherevichki, and appeared again in 2011 as the Mayor of Mexia in Mark-Anthony Turnage's opera Anna Nicole, based on the life of Anna Nicole Smith.

For Opera de Lyon he has sung Gianni Schicchi, Il Tabarro and The Cunning Little Vixen For English National Opera Evans has sung Alfredo in La Traviata, Spoletta and Cavaradossi in Tosca, and Second Jew in Salome. For Opera North he has appeared as Fenton in Falstaff, Prunier in La Rondine and Paulino in The Secret Marriage. For Scottish Opera his roles include Tamino in Die Zauberflöte and the Italian Tenor in Der Rosenkavalier. For Grange Park Opera he has performed the roles of Trufaldino The Love for Three Oranges the Italian Tenor Capriccio the Schoolmaster in The Cunning Little Vixen and Harry in La Fanciulla del West. For the Classical Opera Company Evans sang the role of Fracasso in La Finta Semplice. Other credits include Orpheus in Orpheus in the underworld for Opera Holland Park and The Peacock in Param Vir’s Broken Strings for the Almeida Theatre, which was recorded for the BBC.

Concert singer 
As a concert singer Evans' appearances include Vaughan Williams' Serenade to Music at the televised opening night of the 2001 BBC Proms, Beethoven's Ninth Symphony for RTÉ, Elgars’ The Dream of Gerontius at the Welsh Proms, the Verdi Requiem at the Royal Albert Hall and a recital at the Wigmore Hall, London.

Evans sings as a soloist on three CD volumes entitled Here Come the Classics with the Royal Philharmonic Orchestra, has recorded Salome and Ariadne auf Naxos for Chandos Records and has appeared several times on the BBC's Friday Night is Music Night.

He also presents on BBC Radio Wales with his brother, Mark Evans, and was awarded the MStJ by Queen Elizabeth II in 2008.

Recording artist 
In 2010, Evans signed a six-album deal with Warner Music; his first album is called A Song in My Heart and was released on 21 March 2011. The album went straight to number one in the UK Classical Charts in the following week. His second album, Wynne, was released in 2013.

Television and radio

Go Compare
Since 2009 Evans has starred in an advertising campaign for UK insurance comparison website Go.Compare, playing the flamboyant, operatic tenor Gio Compario.

In 2012, GoCompare launched the 'Saving the Nation' campaign starring Evans again as Gio Compario. Evans made adverts in the series with Sue Barker, Stuart Pearce, Ray Mears, Louis Spence and most famously Professor Stephen Hawking with all of them trying to kill him and thus save the nation from his singing about GoCompare.

Presenting and other

In 2011, Evans began presenting. He presented a programme about the Eisteddfod for the BBC and his own TV show on S4C. In 2012 Evans became a regular presenter on BBC Radio Wales and from October 2013 Evans presented a weekly Friday afternoon show called Wynne Evans' Big Welsh Weekend. Since February 2016, he has presented The Wynne Evans Show on the station from 11am to 2pm every weekday.

Evans was also one of eight celebrities chosen to participate in an intense week of learning Welsh at a campsite in Pembrokeshire for the series cariad@iaith:love4language, shown on S4C in May 2012.

In 2012 Evans presented The Guide to Opera on Classic FM. The show was subsequently nominated for an Arqiva award. In 2013 Evans became a regular presenter on Classic FM. In August 2012 Evans appeared on the football show Soccer AM. He went on the show again in August 2013.

In March 2015 Evans appeared in the Sky 1 comedy drama Stella, as a candidate running for council / Mexican wrestler. The episode ended with Evans singing a couple of numbers.

In 2016 he hosted the BBC One programme Search For A* alongside other celebrities Behnaz Akhgar and Omar Hamdi.

Awards 
Evans was made a member of the Gorsedd of the Bards of Wales in 2012  and an Honorary Fellow of the University of Wales Trinity Saint David in 2013.  He was also made a Member of the Venerable Order of Saint John by HM The Queen in 2008. Evans was awarded the British Empire Medal in the Platinum Jubilee honours list.

Personal life 
Evans is a trustee of The Elizabeth Evans Trust. Evans's mother was Elizabeth Evans MBE, who founded and ran both The Carmarthen Youth Opera and The Lyric Theatre in Carmarthen for 25 years. She died in 2004 and subsequently Evans and his two brothers founded the Trust.
A Film was later made about her life called Save The Cinema, Evans plays a cameo on the film but also made the Behind the curtain programme about his life for Sky Arts. Evans is divorced  and has two children Ismay and Taliesin

References

External links 
 
 
 Wynne Evans (BBC Radio Wales)

1972 births
21st-century Welsh male opera singers
Alumni of the Guildhall School of Music and Drama
Bards of the Gorsedd
Living people
Recipients of the British Empire Medal
Singers from Carmarthenshire
Welsh television actors
Welsh tenors
Welsh-language singers
BBC Radio Wales presenters